A Corps Support Group, or CSG, was a brigade-sized unit in the United States Army. A CSG differs from a DISCOM in that it is a corps, not a divisional, asset. Doctrinally, a CSG serves corps units, not division units, but in practice CSGs typically have a close working relationship with a particular division especially in garrison. A CSG's subordinate units also may be parceled out to different commands in theater, thus their wartime organization will normally significantly differ from their garrison organization.

Typically, a CSG and its subordinate units will only deploy as far forward as the Division Support Area. 
A typical CSG will be organized with a Headquarters Company and a varying number of Corps Support Battalions (CSB's) which may or may not be from the same Fort as the headquarters.
The CSG is normally responsible for reinforcing the logistics units of a Division while primarily supporting the non-divisional units such as Corps Artillery, Corps Military Police, and other higher echelon units.

The US Army has been transforming many CSG's into Sustainment Brigades while Corps Support Battalions are becoming Combat Sustainment Support Battalions (CSSBs). Three of the Corps Support Groups are Stationed at Fort Bragg, NC as part of the XVIII Airborne Corps.

Units

Support groups of the United States Army